Florence Eldridge (born Florence McKechnie, September 5, 1901 – August 1, 1988) was an American actress. She was nominated for the Tony Award for Best Actress in a Play in 1957 for her performance in Long Day's Journey into Night.

Early years
Eldridge was born Florence McKechnie in Brooklyn, New York, the daughter of Charles J. McKechnie.  She attended public schools, including P.S. 85 and Girls' High School.

Stage
Eldridge made her Broadway debut at age 17 as a chorus member of Rock-a-Bye Baby at the Astor Theatre. The reference book American Theatre: A Chronicle of Comedy and Drama, 1930-1969 noted, "In the 1920s she won major attention in such plays as The Cat and the Canary and Six Characters in Search of an Author."

In 1965,  husband Fredric March and she did a world tour under the auspices of the U.S. State Department. Eldridge wrote that they were "experimenting to see if an acting couple doing excerpts from plays on a bare stage could reach and appeal to a worldwide audience."

Personal life
On March 19, 1921, Eldridge married Howard Rumsey, who owned the Empire Theater and the Knickerbocker Players (both in Syracuse) and the Manhattan Players of Rochester. They were wed at her aunt's home in Maplewood, New Jersey.

She was married to Fredric March from 1927 until his death in 1975, and appeared alongside him on stage and in seven films. They adopted two children, Penelope and Anthony. Like her husband, she was a liberal Democrat.

Partial credits

Stage
The Cat and the Canary
Six Characters in Search of an Author
An Enemy of the People
Long Day's Journey Into Night
The Skin of Our Teeth
The Autumn Garden

Screen
Six Cylinder Love (1923) as Marilyn Sterling
The Studio Murder Mystery (1929) as Blanche Hardell
The Greene Murder Case (1929) as Sibella Greene
Charming Sinners (1929) as Helen Carr
The Divorcee (1930) as Helen
The Matrimonial Bed (1930) as Juliet Corton
Thirteen Women (1932) as Grace Coombs
The Great Jasper (1933) as Jenny Horn
Dangerously Yours (1933) as Jo Horton
The Story of Temple Drake (1933) as Ruby Lemarr
A Modern Hero (1934) as Leah Ernst
Les Misérables (1935) as Fantine
Mary of Scotland (1936) as Elizabeth Tudor
Another Part of the Forest (1948) as Lavinia Hubbard
An Act of Murder (1948) as Catherine Cooke
Christopher Columbus (1949) as Queen Isabella
Inherit the Wind (1960) as Sarah Brady

Radio appearances

References

External links

 
 
 

1901 births
1988 deaths
American film actresses
American radio actresses
Actresses from New York City
American stage actresses
People from Brooklyn
People from Long Beach, California
20th-century American actresses
Burials in Connecticut
Connecticut Democrats
California Democrats
New York (state) Democrats
Girls' High School alumni